Stagecoach South is a bus operator providing services in South East England. It is a subsidiary of Stagecoach. It operates services in Hampshire, Surrey, and Sussex with some routes extending into Brighton and Wiltshire. It operates 487 buses from eight depots.

It is branded as four sub-divisions: Stagecoach in Hampshire, Stagecoach in Hants & Surrey, Stagecoach in the South Downs, and Stagecoach in Portsmouth.

Stagecoach in Hampshire

Stagecoach in Hampshire operates from depots in Andover, Basingstoke, and Winchester.

In 2015, Stagecoach unveiled £2.5 million investment in new Alexander Dennis Enviro200 MMC buses for Winchester park and ride services, featuring a gold and purple livery, inspired by King Alfred the Great.

In 2017, Stagecoach launched six new Alexander Dennis Enviro400 MMC buses for the route 64 to Alton, which also received extra journeys in evenings and Sundays, the unveiling taking place at the Winchester Science Centre.

In December 2019 E200 MMCs started running in Basingstoke. USB charge points are availble on these buses. All the buses now have a advert for cleaner air in the town and surrounding areas and routes. Two of the buses went to 2 different depots, one to Winchester, the other to Portsmouth/Havant.

Stagecoach in Hants & Surrey
Stagecoach in Hants & Surrey operates from depots in Aldershot and in Peasmarsh, just outside of Guildford. It is made up of Alder Valley's remaining operations, taken over by Stagecoach on 26 October 1992. The company operates a number of routes across Hampshire and Surrey, serving Aldershot, Camberley, Farnborough, Godalming, and Guildford.

Many of the routes are branded, with large route number vinyls, or with names such as Yo-Yo and The Kite.

In 2002, a number 22 Stagecoach bus, operating a journey from Aldershot to the Old Dean estate, was hijacked by two armed men.

On 9 February 2009 route 1 was upgraded to Goldline status with new vehicles. Route 2 lost its service name of The Marbles in 2008/9. Due to Hampshire County Council cuts in October 2011, routes 2 and 3 lost some of their evening services on Monday-Friday. Route 18 also lost a handful of evening services. Route 41 Ash to Farnborough was taken over by Countryliner.

In September 2012, Surrey County Council's bus review phase 3 saw route 92 renumbered to 72 to fit with routes 70 and 71.

However, a month later, Countryliner went into administration, with Stagecoach taking back route 46, as well as Surrey County Council school routes 43, 45, and 87, all on an emergency basis until July 2013. Countryliner ceased trading on 18 January 2013 with Stagecoach operating route 41 for one week before it passed to sister company Fleet Buzz.

Stagecoach stepped in to take control of the route 94 between Bracknell and Camberley, after First proposed to close its bus depot in Bracknell and withdraw most of its services in the area from Saturday 29 August 2015. However, Stagecoach withdrew the service from 12 March 2016 over its loss-making nature.

Stagecoach in Hants & Surrey opened a new depot at Peasmarsh in October 2015, which oversaw the relocation of several south Surrey bus routes from Aldershot and Haslemere to the new depot.

After the takeover of Fleet Buzz, the Hants & Surrey division maintained a presence in Reading until 16 April 2018, when the route 7 was split and Reading Buses took over the northern section to Fleet. As part of the deal, two Stagecoach vehicles were sold to Reading Buses.

Two brand new services were launched from 29 July 2018 serving Guildford, the University of Surrey and Stoughton. In January 2019, working with the BYD/ADL Partnership, energy storage specialist Zenobe Energy, as well as members of Surrey County Council and Guildford Borough Council, Stagecoach in Hants & Surrey introduced nine electric Alexander Dennis Enviro200EV buses on their Guildford Park & Ride network, representing an investment of over £3 million.

After Arriva announced their withdrawal of bus operations from their Guildford base in November 2021, Stagecoach announced it would take over Arriva's commercial routes from Guildford, Cranleigh and Woking. However, shortly after the network expansion, Stagecoach reduced frequencies on its services owing to a driver shortage following the COVID-19 pandemic.

Despite the reduced timetable coming into effect on 2 January 2022, routes continued to suffer cancellations. For example, on Thursday 30 June 2022, the company had to cancel 70 journeys, posting cancellations on their Twitter feed. This occasionally left a number of schoolchildren in Surrey stranded. A further timetable reduction was announced by summer 2022, affecting the high-frequency Guildford and Woking town services.

From 1 May 2022, the route 91, which runs between Woking, Goldsworth Park and Knaphill, was given a boost in frequency to every 10-12 minutes during weekdays, every 12-15 minutes on Saturdays, and every 20 minutes on Sundays. However, this was reverted back to every 15 minutes on Monday to Saturdays due to the ongoing driver shortage.

Stagecoach in the South Downs

Stagecoach in the South Downs operates from depots in Chichester, Portsmouth,  Worthing, and Bordon and Petersfield. In August 1989, Stagecoach purchased Southdown Motor Services, which had previously been owned by the National Bus Company until sold in a management buy out.

From 16 April 2018, West Sussex County Council had arranged for bus routes 54, 91, 92, and 93; all primarily based in Petersfield; to be operated by Stagecoach, replacing the arrangement with the Emsworth & District Motor Services.

Stagecoach in Portsmouth
Stagecoach in Portsmouth operates buses in the Portsmouth city area as well as Havant, Waterlooville, and Hayling Island areas.

The main routes in which they operate are as follows: Route 20 From Havant to Portsmouth Hard via QA Hospital; route 21 from Havant to Portsmouth via Anchorage Park; route 23 from Southsea to Leigh Park via Farlington; route 39 from Havant Bus station to Wecock Farm in Waterlooville via Asda after 9:00 and before 3:00; routes 30 and 31 from Havant to Hayling island. 

The company also operates the Coastliner 700 service from Portsmouth to Brighton.

Fleet Buzz

Fleet Buzz, initially known as Countywide Travel, was formed in 1995 as a bus and coach company, based on vehicles from Marchwood Motorways and a depot was established in Basingstoke. In 1998 the depot relocated to the site formerly used by Oakley Coaches in Oakley, Hampshire, placing itself at a strategic location on a route the company ran between Basingstoke and Winchester. Countywide Travel also parked buses at Hart District Council's Household Waste Recycling Centre near Hartley Wintney, but, due to safety concerns, vacated the latter premises in 2007.

Countywide Travel took over many of the routes from Tillingbourne Bus Company when it ceased trading in 2001. On 1 October 2007 the coach business was sold to Weavaway Travel and the bus operation moved to Crondall. Around this time, the company was renamed Fleet Buzz as a wordplay for its predominant presence at Fleet, Hampshire.

Mercedes-Benz Varios used to form the backbone of the fleet, but in 2008/09 the company upgraded its fleet with the purchase of four new Optare Solos and four Optare Versas, as well as two Caetano Nimbuses that previously operated with Travel de Courcey and Reading Buses. These buses were painted in a livery of yellow (lower body) and black (upper body). Afterwards, other Stagecoach-branded buses replaced the remainder of the step-entrance fleet.

In December 2011, the business was sold to Stagecoach with 22 buses and 29 staff. It was run as a low-cost unit of Stagecoach South. Alongside the new Optare buses, four Plaxton Pointers and three Alexander ALX200s - one in plain white - were transferred from Selkent. Further withdrawn step-entrance Stagecoach buses were transferred or placed on loan to the division.

Major network changes in April 2013 saw the Fleet Buzz franchise expand further into Surrey, Basingstoke and Reading.

On 31 December 2014, three years after the Stagecoach takeover, the website was updated to announce the end of the Fleet Buzz name with operations fully integrated into Stagecoach South from the date of a major network change on 5 January 2015. The depot at Crondall closed on 23 May 2015, with staff, routes and buses transferred to Basingstoke and Aldershot.

See also
List of bus operators of the United Kingdom

References

External links

Official website

Stagecoach Group bus operators in England
Bus operators in Hampshire
Bus operators in Surrey
Bus operators in Berkshire
Bus operators in West Sussex
Bus operators in Wiltshire